Francisco Miró Quesada Cantuarias  (21 December 1918 – 11 June 2019) was a Peruvian philosopher, journalist and politician.

In his works he discusses the belief in "human nature" on the basis that any collective assumption about such a nature will be frustrating, and will have negative public results. He was interested in so-called "unorthodox logics". The term "paraconsistent logic" was coined in 1976 by him. He made his editorial debut in 1941, with Sense of the phenomenological movement.

He was the first person of the Americas to hold the position of president of the International Federation of Philosophy Societies, elected in Moscow in 1990.

Biography
He was the son of journalist Óscar Miró Quesada de la Guerra and María Josefina Cantuarias Dañino. His father, a renowned social researcher, was director of the newspaper El Comercio belonging to his family.

He completed his school studies, first, at the Pensionnat du Sacré-Coeur de Passy, in Paris, and then at the schools of the Sacred Hearts of Belén and Recoleta, and at the Antonio Raimondi Italian school in Lima. He completed his studies at the Faculty of Arts of the Pontifical Catholic University of Peru, where he graduated from Bachelor of Philosophy with the thesis Crítica de la prueba ontológica a través de San Anselmo, Descartes, Spinoza y Leibniz (Critic of the ontological test through San Anselmo, Descartes, Spinoza and Leibniz) in 1938, and he continued at the National University of San Marcos, where he studied Philosophy and Mathematics, opting for the degree of doctor with the thesis Algunos estudios sobre las categorías. Ensayo de una crítica de la vida sicológica en general (Some studies on the categories. Essay of a critique of psychological life in general) in 1939. Subsequently, he obtained the bachelors in Mathematics and Law (1953) in the latter university and the title of lawyer.

He made his debut in 1941 with Sentido del movimiento fenomenológico (Meaning of the phenomenological movement).  The term paraconsistent logic was coined by Miró Quesada at the Third Latin America Conference on Mathematical Logic in 1976.

After Miró Quesada graduated from the University of San Marcos with a doctorate in Philosophy, he began teaching there as a professor of Contemporary Philosophy. Later, in 1952, he was granted a scholarship by UNESCO to go to France, Italy, and England to study the formation of the secondary teaching staff. In 1953, he published the Sunday Supplement (el Suplemento Dominical).

In July 1963, during the first Popular Action government, President Fernando Belaúnde Terry appointed him Minister of Public Education of Peru. As such, he made several innovations, among which highlight the creation of an office dedicated to serving parents, another oriented to the attention of the members of the teachers' union; the massive construction of classrooms using the methods of Popular Cooperation – one of the principles inspired by the acciopopulist ideology; the application, for the first time, of bilingual education methods in Peru; and the incorporation of a high percentage of the primary school population into the education system. In October 1964, he was questioned by the appropriate majority of the National Parliament and censured for leaving the floor without the debate over the alleged illegal transfer of several million soles from his office.

During the government of Francisco Morales Bermúdez, he was an ideologist summoned for this management and worked as a professor at Cayetano Heredia University and Lima University. Upon reaching seventy years of age, he was dismissed at the University of Lima; and went on to work at the Ricardo Palma University. He continues publishing in the newspaper of his family, El Comercio de Lima.

From 2003 to September 2008, he served as the journalistic director of the newspaper El Comercio.

Francisco Miró Quesada Cantuarias received on 9 December 2008 the Medal of Honor of the Congress of the Republic, in the degree of Grand Officer for his outstanding philosophical work, journalism, political thought and scientific dissemination.

References

External links
 Francisco Miró-Quesada Cantuarias 

1918 births
2019 deaths
Writers from Lima
Peruvian people of Catalan descent
Peruvian people of Jewish descent
Peruvian people of French descent
Peruvian people of Venezuelan descent
Peruvian people of Panamanian descent
Peruvian people of Basque descent
Former Roman Catholics
Popular Action (Peru) politicians
Peruvian philosophers
Peruvian journalists
Male journalists
Peruvian male writers
Government ministers of Peru
Peruvian Ministers of Education
National University of San Marcos alumni
Academic staff of the National University of San Marcos
Grand Crosses of the Order of the Sun of Peru
Peruvian atheists
Peruvian centenarians
Ambassadors of Peru to France
Men centenarians